The United States competed at the 1964 Winter Olympics in Innsbruck, Austria.

Medalists 

The following U.S. competitors won medals at the games. In the by discipline sections below, medalists' names are bolded. 

| width="78%" align="left" valign="top" |

| width=22% align=left valign=top |

Alpine skiing

Men

Women

Biathlon

Bobsleigh

Cross-country skiing

Figure skating

Individual

Pairs

Ice hockey

Summary

Roster

First Round
Winners (in bold) qualified for the Group A to play for 1st-8th places. Teams, which lost their qualification matches, played in Group B for 9th-16th places.

|}

Medal Round
First place team wins gold, second silver and third bronze.

USSR 5-1 USA
USA 8-0 Germany (UTG)
Sweden 7-4 USA
Canada 8-6 USA
Czechoslovakia 7-1 USA
Finland 3-2 USA
USA 7-3 Switzerland

Luge

Nordic combined

Ski jumping

Speed skating

Men

Women

References
Official Olympic Reports
 Olympic Winter Games 1964, full results by sports-reference.com
 

Nations at the 1964 Winter Olympics
1964
Oly